Heartland Motorsports Park, formerly known as Heartland Park Topeka, is a multi-purpose motorsports facility  south of downtown Topeka, Kansas near the Topeka Regional Airport.

When it opened in 1989, Heartland Motorsports Park was the first new auto racing facility to be built in the United States for 20 years. After several years of neglect from continual financial difficulties, the track surface and other facilities had deteriorated badly. The track's survival was in doubt until 2003, when Raymond Irwin, former owner (1986-2007) of Blackhawk Farms Raceway bought it and began major renovations.

In December 2015, Chris Payne and Todd Crossley of Shelby Development, LLC. purchased the track. Payne, the CEO of Shelby Development, became the track's sole owner  in January 2017.

The drag-strip is used by local clubs and the National Hot Rod Association. The road-course is mainly used by the SCCA, the National Auto Sport Association and marque-clubs. The track was the home of both the SCCA National Championship Runoffs and the Tire Rack SCCA Solo National Championships from 2006 to 2008. In the past, it has hosted ARCA, ASA, IMSA, AMA, the NASCAR Craftsman Truck Series' race: O'Reilly Auto Parts 275, NASCAR Busch North Series, NASCAR Midwest Series and the NASCAR Southeast Series.

The full 2.5 mile road course (and pit road) was completely repaved with a high-tech, polymer-enhanced asphalt in the fall of 2016, and continues to host events.

Lap Records
The fastest official race lap records at Heartland Motorsports Park Topeka are listed as:

Former logo

References

External links 
Official website

Trackpedia guide to driving this track

Buildings and structures in Topeka, Kansas
Motorsport venues in Kansas
Topeka
Topeka
NHRA Division 5 drag racing venues
IMSA GT Championship circuits
Tourist attractions in Topeka, Kansas
Off-road racing venues in the United States
Sports venues completed in 1989
1989 establishments in Kansas